Caloptilia pneumatica is a moth of the family Gracillariidae. It is known from Brazil.

References

pneumatica
Moths of South America
Moths described in 1920